Bowmont is a small rural farming community in Canyon County, in the southwestern part of the U.S. state of Idaho.  It is located north of Melba and south of Nampa.

History
Bowmont's population was 25 in 1960.

References

Unincorporated communities in Canyon County, Idaho
Unincorporated communities in Idaho
Boise metropolitan area